The 2007 UCI Track Cycling World Championships – Men's 1 km Time Trial was the 2007 world championship track cycling time trial. It was held on April 1, 2007, and won by Chris Hoy, who had announced beforehand his intention to stop competing in the event following these championships since the event would not be included on the Olympics programme from 2008. The event was conducted over a single round.

World record

Results

References

Men's 1 km time trial
UCI Track Cycling World Championships – Men's 1 km time trial